Daphnia commutata is a species of water flea.

References

Cladocera
Crustaceans described in 1900